The Community Health Nurses' & Midwifery Training College (formerly known as Community Health Nurses' Training) is public tertiary health education institution in Tanoso in the Ahafo Region of Ghana. The college is in the Tano North District. The activities of the institution are supervised by the Ministry of Health.  

The Community Health Nurses' & Midwifery Training College was established in October 2003 in accordance with the Government policy to establish a Community Health Nurses' Training School in every region in Ghana. This was made possible through the efforts of Ernest Akoubour Debrah (former Regional Minister of Brong Ahafo), Nana Asare Baffour, and Chief Ibrahim (former Regional Director of Health Service). The college is affiliated with the Kwame Nkrumah University of Science and Technology (KNUST), and accredited by the National Accreditation Board of Ghana. It holds a professional accreditation from the Nursing and Midwifery Council of Ghana.

Principals of the College 

1. Josephine Koranteng Asare    2003 - 2011

2. Abotzabire A William                2011 - 2015

3. Francis Ayaba (FGCNM)         2015 - 2016

4. Elizabeth Wiafe                           2016 - To Date

Academic Programmes 

 Post NAP/NAC MIDWIFERY (Diploma)

 Registered Community Health Nursing (Diploma)

 Nurse Assistant Preventive (Certificate)

References

Nursing and midwifery colleges in Ghana